Luna Park is a name shared by dozens of currently operating and defunct amusement parks. They are named after, and partly based on, the first Luna Park, which opened in 1903 during the heyday of large Coney Island parks. Luna parks are small-scale attraction parks, easily accessed, potentially addressed to the permanent or temporary residential market, and located in the suburbs or even near the town center. Luna parks mainly offer classic funfair attractions (great wheel), newer features (electronic displays) and catering services.

History
The original Luna Park on Coney Island, a massive spectacle of rides, ornate towers and cupolas covered in 250,000 electric lights, was opened in 1903 by the showmen and entrepreneurs Frederic Thompson and Elmer "Skip" Dundy. The park was either named after the fanciful airship Luna, part of the new park's central attraction A Trip to the Moon, or after Dundy's sister. Luna Park was a vastly expanded attraction built partly on the grounds of Sea Lion Park, the first enclosed amusement park on Coney Island which closed down due to competition from nearby Steeplechase Park.

In 1905, Frederick Ingersoll, who was already making a reputation for his pioneering work in roller coaster construction and design (he also designed scenic railroad rides) borrowed the name when he opened Luna Park in Pittsburgh and Luna Park in Cleveland. These first two amusement parks, like their namesake, were covered with electric lighting (the former was adorned with 67,000 light bulbs; the latter, 50,000). Later, in 1907, Charles Looff opened another Luna Park in Seattle, Washington. Ultimately, Ingersoll opened 44 Luna Parks around the world, the first chain of amusement parks. For a short time, Ingersoll renamed his parks Ingersoll's Luna Park to distinguish them from the Luna Parks to which he had no connection. Ingersoll's death in 1927 and the closing of most of his Luna Parks did not stop new parks from taking the name.

Today, the term luna park or lunapark is a noun meaning "amusement park" in several languages, including Indo-European languages such as Hungarian,
Polish, French, Italian, Russian and Greek, as well as Turkish and Hebrew (לוּנָה פַּארְק, but the term גן שעשועים lit. 'park of amusements' is also widely used).

List of Luna Parks

In Africa

In Asia

In Europe

In North America

In Oceania

In South America

See also

References

Amusement park companies
Defunct amusement parks